Mövenpick Ice Cream is a brand of ice cream of Swiss origin produced by Nestlé, and now is the new company called Froneri since 2016 in joint-venture with Nestlé and R&R Ice Cream.

History
The first Mövenpick restaurant opened in Zürich on 19 July 1948 by Ueli Prager. By 1958, they had eight restaurants located throughout Switzerland. Prager would remain operating manager of the Mövenpick group, now called Mövenpick Hotels & Resorts, until 1991.

Originally, in the 1960s, the ice cream was produced by the Mövenpick group for restaurant sales only. The plant in Bursins was built in 1972, however, production has now been shifted to a larger unit in Rorschach.

In 1974, Mövenpick was licensed in Germany by ice cream manufacturer, Theo Schöller, later known as Scholler Lebensmittel GmbH & Co KG. In 2002, EU regulators reviewed, and later approved, Nestlé's purchase of the Scholler Holding Group from Sudzucker, including licensing to sell Mövenpick in some European countries. The decision was made because while the merger would strengthen Nestlé's positioning in the ice cream market, Unilever's role in the market would ensure continued strong competition in the sector.

In March 2000, Mövenpick acquired the Auckland-based Chateau Creme Delight Ice Cream company.

In 2002, Bauer was licensed to distribute and market Mövenpick in the United Kingdom.

In April 2003, Nestlé bought the international rights for Mövenpick ice cream from the hotel group, and an independent business unit called "Swiss Premium Ice Cream" was created. The buy-out contract did not include the New Zealand manufacturing facilities.

As of 2014, the business was operated by a subsidiary called "Nestlé Super Premium", headquartered in Vevey, Switzerland. In 2016, it was one of the brands that Nestlé contributed to a new joint venture with R&R Ice Cream, called Froneri.

Production and distribution
The main production site is in Switzerland. Halal production for the Middle East takes place at the Nestlé factory in Egypt.

The company has partnered licensing agreements in Germany, Norway, Sweden, Finland, Egypt, and Saudi Arabia.

In February 2006, Nestlé Schöller announced a newly patented type of "conching" process. The conchier process uses temperature reduction and slow, constant two-wave stirring to develop microscopic ice crystals and bubbles as the ice cream freezes. Minimising the need for large ice crystals reduces the required fat content by 30 to 40%, so the process creates low-fat ice cream, but with a creamy consistency and intense taste. The process was used to reduce the fat content in Bourbon Vanilla, Chocolate Chips, Erdbeer (strawberry) Cream and Maple Walnuts flavors. Machinery at the Uelzen factory was upgraded at a cost of 5 to 6 million euros. In 2007, the conchier process was introduced to create "Decorative" category flavors with less than ten percent fat content: Cioccolata Straccietella, Caramel Brulee, Marzipan Chocolate and Chocolate Rum-Grape-Nut. This ice cream, in recent years, has shifted from sugar to glucose syrup in their ingredient list.

In July 2017, Emerald Foods (Australia) Pty Ltd. purchased the master franchise rights for the Mövenpick parlours in Australia from Peters Ice Cream. Peters continued as the Mövenpick distributor for other channels in Australia.

Contracted production

Canada 
In the 1990s, Mövenpick-branded products were made at plants in Simcoe, Ontario. Production was managed by Beatrice Foods, whose ice cream division was bought in 1994 by Good Humor-Popsicle (a child company of Unilever).

In 2001, Delicious Alternative Desserts Ltd. (DAD) received the contract to co-pack Mövenpick products in Canada, in packaging customised to the region. DAD was placed in receivership in 2002. Bankruptcy trustee KPMG continued limited production of Mövenpick at Stoney Creek Dairy, which was purchased by Better Beef Ltd. in February 2002. Better Beef was sold to Cargill Inc. in 2005, and the dairy was purchased by Creme Glacee Lambert in 2009, and closed in 2010.

Egypt 
In 2013, Nestlé upgraded their ice cream factory in Egypt, where Mövenpick ice creams are produced for export to Malaysia.

Germany 
Nestlé produces Mövenpick ice cream in Germany, but sold part of its licensing and production facilities for trade brands to ice cream manufacturer Rosen Eiskrem GmbH of Waldfeucht-Haaren in January 2007. The co-packing agreement and sale included plants in Nurnberg and Prenzlau. Nestlé Schöller remained at their Nurnberg headquarters, and retained their Uelzen plant.

New Zealand 
In September 1998, New Zealand-based Southern Fresh Milk Company received a $20 million 10-year contract from Mövenpick Asia-Pacific to produce and supply Mövenpick-branded ice cream to Asia and Australia. Southern Fresh was to create 11 ice cream flavors and 640,000 litres of ice cream annually. The contract did not include production or distribution of the desserts within New Zealand, as the importation and distribution contract was already allocated to Tip Top Foods, which was intended to span 1988 to 2006. When the contract was awarded to Southern Fresh, Tip Top published an advertisement to clarify that they continued to hold the New Zealand market contract.

The Southern Fresh contract was later expanded to a revised $60 million, increasing to 16 flavors and 2.25 million litres of ice cream each year. The extra funds allowed for the expansion of a manufacturing plant with a dedicated Mövenpick production area. Southern Fresh's contract allowed for sending the ice cream to Australia, Japan, and Singapore. Initial plans were to later export to South Korea, China, and Hong Kong. One of the ice cream flavors produced for the Japanese market was Green Tea in 100ml containers.

Southern Fresh purchased an additional factory in East Tāmaki, Auckland, in April 2000, which raised concerns that production work would be taken from the Invercargill factory.

On 23 December 2000, 20 of the Southern Fresh workers at the Ettrick Street, Invercargill, factory received notice that their employee contracts would not be renewed. The contractors were temporarily employed to produce Mövenpick ice cream. One of the workers speculated in a Southland Times article that the redundancies were linked to quality control. Southern Fresh executives countered that the job changes were a result of technical problems at the factory and market fluctuations. They later stated that the problem was more about "presentation", despite Mövenpick itself supplying the packaging to the factory.

The 2001 opening of the Auckland plant overrode the existing Tip Top Foods contract with Mövenpick.

In April 2001, prior to Mövenpick's acquisition by Nestlé, executive Chris White moved from his Mövenpick Asia-Pacific chief executive role to a position at Nestlé. White had previously assured staff at the Mövenpick Invercargill factory that the Southern Fresh contract would not be impacted by a new Auckland factory.

In April 2001, newspaper articles stated that Mövenpick ceased buying ice cream from Southern Fresh for the Japanese market, but the orders had ceased since November 2000. A Mövenpick executive stated that the companies were "...working through issues...". A Mövenpick executive stated that there were quality problems, but a Southern Fresh executive disputed this, noting the Japanese recession and that Southern Fresh were being used as a scapegoat for Mövenpick's marketing difficulties in Japan. That same month, Southern Fresh dismissed 20 employees from the Invercargill factory as a result of the withdrawn Mövenpick orders. That same month, Southern Fresh stated in the media that they were owed millions of dollars by Mövenpick. There were arbitration meetings between Mövenpick and Southern Fresh in August 2001, which acknowledged that their contract lapsed in November 2000. In September 2001, Mövenpick stated that all issues between the parties had been resolved. In February 2002, Southern Fresh chief executive Alasdair McLachlan described the Mövenpick deal as "disastrous", identifying it as "Mövenpick's [contract] failure is what killed us.", in being the main contributing factor for Southern Fresh's significant loan, and later buyout, by dairy company Mainland. Mainland closed the Invercargill factory in July 2002.

At the time of the 2003 acquisition of Mövenpick by Nestlé, Chateau Creme Delight Ice Cream company continued to produce Mövenpick ice creams under license. The New Zealand rights were not included in the Nestlé contract, and Nestlé did not have their own production facilities in the country. Mövenpick retained the Chateau rights because it wanted to increase its presence in the Asia Pacific region. In October 2003, International Dairy Ventures (IDV) purchased the New Zealand operations of Chateau, including the Nestlé-licensed Mövenpick productions and the Mövenpick store in Mission Bay, Auckland.

Mövenpick products were later made by Emerald Foods, a company owned by Mövenpick until December 2003, when it was sold to the Emerald Group. In December 2005, Emerald Group CEO Diane Foreman noted a supply challenge, in that Emerald was contractually obliged to buy all raw materials from Swiss-based Mövenpick, to make licensed Mövenpick products. In late 2009, Emerald signed a contract with Mövenpick for a further four years.

The ice cream making subsidiary of the Emerald Group was then sold to Emerald Foods Group (HK) in April 2015.

Pakistan 
In the 1990s, Ambrosia International Limited (Pvt) (AIL) began a licensing agreement with Mövenpick to produce their branded ice creams in Pakistan. The JOFA Group has been the exclusive franchiser for the brand since 2002.

Saudi Arabia 
From the late 1980s until 2009, SADAFCO produced Mövenpick-branded products at plants in Jeddah, Riyadh, Dammam, and Madinah. However, starting in 2011, Mohammed Khaled Alkhulaidi Trading Establishment ("MKKTE") became the exclusive franchiser of the brand in Saudi Arabia, importing Mövenpick ice cream products and distributing them to hotels and through different points of sale across the kingdom.

Sweden 
In 2011, Swedish ice cream manufacturer Triumf Glass introduced Mövenpick Classic flavors to the Swedish market in 900ml packaging. Flavors included Almond & Vanilla, Caramelita, Maple Walnut, Strawberry, Swiss Chocolate, and Vanilla Dream.

United States 
Mövenpick-branded ice cream was first produced in America in the late 1980s by Sunnyside Farms Dairy at a plant in Turlock, California.

Products

As at March 2018, Mövenpick categorise their products into "collections": ice creams, sorbets, 'on the go' and limited editions.

Ice creams and sorbets 
In 1984, the Mövenpick restaurant in Toronto was highlighted as having "...interesting concoctions..." with flavors of; blackberry yogurt, apple blossom and espresso.

In 2009, the Tiramisu ice cream flavor was named Champion ice cream in the Wrest Point Royal Hobart Fine Food awards.

In 2010, the Swiss Chocolate flavor, and the Maple Walnut flavor (made by Emerald Foods) won Gold Awards in the Premium Ice Cream category in the New Zealand Ice Cream Awards.

In circa 2013, ice cream flavor collections were organised into: Classics, Delicés de fruit, and Harmony.

Mövenpick was the winner of the ice cream category in the 2018 Chefs' Choice Awards, and their Cinnamon ice cream received the most positive marks from the judging panel.

"Ice cream of the year" voting

The annual "Ice cream of the year" was established in circa 1988. The "Winter ice cream of the year" or "Ice creations of the Winter" was established in 1995.

Yogurts 
Premium low-fat yogurts are created under the Mövenpick brand, they were first sold through Germany's Bauer brand in 2013. In 2017, the yogurt limited edition Winter flavors included cherry-chocolate, vanilla, café nougatine and plum-cinnamon.

Availability
While Mövenpick ice cream was originally only produced for their branded restaurants in Switzerland, as at 2011, it was sold in almost 40 countries. Products are sold through retail channels, parlours and hotels or restaurants.

The branded franchised stores ("dessert cafes", parlours, "Mövenpick boutiques", or "ice cream galleries") are in many different countries. The stores have also been named "Ice Dreams", for their focus on incorporating Mövenpick ice creams into dessert recipes. In 2010, the national retail manager for the brand in Australia, Dennis Koorey, described Mövenpick's parlours as a "...dine-in dessertery."

Retail 
In 1989, Mövenpick attempted to introduce their ice creams in Canada, but encountered local production difficulties due to dairy industry buy-outs. In July 1992, they again began selling their products in Canadian supermarkets, but with revised packaging. Instead of 1-litre rectangular brick-size packages, the ice cream was packaged in Häagen-Dazs-style 500ml tubs.

In 1999, six flavors of Mövenpick ice creams were introduced to the Japanese market at convenience stores, through a Japanese subsidiary company.

In 2008, four flavors (Swiss Chocolate, Maple Walnut, Panna Cotta, White Peach & Redcurrant) of Mövenpick ice creams in 500ml containers, began being sold in England's Tesco supermarkets. In 2013, Mövenpick made an agreement with England's Ocado supermarkets to sell four flavors (Caramelita, Swiss Chocolate, Vanilla Dream and Strawberry) in 900ml containers.

In 2007, Hemglass began a contract as the exclusive seller of Mövenpick products in Sweden, at their ice cream vans.

In 2016, Mövenpick again began selling ice cream in 500ml tubs in supermarkets. Ice cream flavors offered included Vanilla Dream, Swiss Chocolate, Strawberry, Caramelita, Maple Walnut and Tiramisu. Sorbet flavors included Raspberry & Strawberry and Passionfruit & Mango.

Stores

Asia Pacific 
Australia

Mövenpick stores first opened in Australia in Sydney and the Gold Coast. In 2007, Crepe Cafe chain owners Norbert and Amel Baillette opened the second Australian Mövenpick store in Portside Wharf, Hamilton, Brisbane. In early 2008, they opened at Bondi Beach, launching the Gingerbread ice cream and Orange & Grapefruit sorbet. In May, 70 celebrities were given "silver spoons", entitling them to free ice cream for the remainder of 2008.

That same year, stores opened in Cairns' Sanctuary Cove, Manly, Melbourne's Docklands and Brisbane's Petrie Terrace. In 2009, they opened at the Gold Coast's Broadbeach and Brisbane's South Bank.

In 2010, the 11 stores across Australia were fitted out with rebranded color schemes of black, white and some red, replacing the earthy and natural colors and tones. At the time, 10 of the parlours were franchised and the Bondi Beach store was company-owned.

In 2011, the first boutique café concept opened at Doncaster Westfield, Melbourne.

In 2012, they opened a boutique in Newcastle, and another in Melbourne's Box Hill in June.

In January 2015, a boutique opened in Adelaide.

In March 2016, the Canberra store opened at the Kingston foreshore.

In October 2009, the Brisbane (South Bank) store exhibited confectionery-inspired jewellery by designer Liana Kabel. Kabel's designs reused materials such as buttons, tape measures and knitting needles.

As of 2019 Mövenpick has only 6 of the 25 stores open and is currently in federal court of Australia facing legal action by its franchisee for alleged misleading and deceptive conduct.

China

In December 2016, the first Mövenpick store was opened in China, in a shopping mall in Guangzhou TaiKoo Hui. The store was opened by Swire Pacific, Mövenpick's exclusive distributor for the mainland.

Hong Kong

In August 1993, Mövenpick opened a boutique in Discovery Bay. The store had previously been a Häagen-Dazs-branded ice cream parlour. That same year, two boutiques were also opened in Tsim Sha Tsui.

New Zealand

In 2003, Mövenpick opened their Caffe Glacier at Mission Bay, Auckland, at the former site of a Death by Chocolate franchised store. In 2011, a fifth store for Auckland in Quay Street was opened, and was the first full concept parlour for New Zealand.

In September 2012, Mövenpick planned to open a storefront on the corner of Manners Mall and Victoria Street, Wellington. A previous store within the Caffers Dock apartment complex was closed circa 2009.

In December 2016, a Mövenpick store was opened in Paihia, in the Bay of Islands.

Singapore

Between 2000 to 2003, Mövenpick opened two ice cream parlors at Tangs Plaza on Scotts Road and Great World City Shopping Center in Tanglin.

In late 2006, Mövenpick opened a seaside kiosk at Palawan Beach, Sentosa.

South Asia 
Bangladesh

Mövenpick has been available in Bangladesh since 2007. The stores are mostly concentrated in Dhaka with few in Chittagong; ice cream is available in the cities and also Sylhet in retail stores.

India

In 2001, Mövenpick opened their first Indian café in New Delhi. Other boutiques were later opened in Bangalore and Chennai. In September 2002, Mövenpick ended their franchisee agreement with Ravi Jaipuria. Jaipuria stated that this was due to high real estate costs and low customer traffic, however a Mövenpick representative alleged that Jaipuria did not spend enough time on the franchise. In 2003, Mövenpick relaunched in the country through agreements with Rai and Sons. In 2011, Mövenpick had stores in Kalaghoda and Peddar Road. In 2013, Mövenpick had a distribution agreement with Star Foods Specialty. In 2014, the third Indian Mövenpick store opened at Select City Walk, Saket, New Delhi. In September 2015, the first Mumbai boutique was opened on Juhu Tara road.

Mövenpick ice creams are imported into India by Nectar Hospitality.

In 2020, Mövenpick relaunched in the country through agreements with Mr Vedant Deshpande (Managing Director) of Koala Super Premium Pvt Ltd. They have been appointed as the exclusive import and distribution partner for Mövenpick Ice Cream in India from 1 January 2020. 

Pakistan

There are Mövenpick boutiques and kiosks in shopping malls in Karachi and Lahore. In April 2015, a boutique was opened in the Country and Golf Club in the Defence Housing Authority, Karachi.

Sri Lanka

In 2004, tea producer Dilmah collaborated with Mövenpick to create ice cream tea-shakes for their parlors.

Media coverage 
In June 1996, in response to complaints by English MPs and parliamentary staff, Mövenpick ice creams were removed from the House of Commons menu. The branded ice creams had been available on the menu for two days prior to removal. The complainants alleged that it was unpatriotic for the German-produced Swiss brand to be sold in the parliament in the midst of bovine spongiform encephalopathy-related export bans on English beef in Germany.

In October 2006, a customer complaint letter was published in the New Zealand Herald. The complainant alleged that staff at the Auckland Mövenpick store refused to serve a pregnant customer a free glass of tap water, as the company policy was to sell mineral water. Two days later, the same newspaper noted that the company policy had been changed to allow the serving of free tap water.

In September 2010, in an article in The Times, Mövenpick's tagline of "The art of Swiss ice cream" was used as an example in the proposed "Swissness Bill". The Swiss Government proposed to legally determine the requirements for products to be advertised as "made in Switzerland".

In June 2012, the Finnish Consumer Agency analysed the fruit, sugar and fat content of chocolate and strawberry ice creams sold from kiosks. Mövenpick's Swiss Chocolate flavor was found to have the highest amount of fat, among the brands and flavors tested.

In August 2016, Russia's consumer protection organisation Roscontrol found that Mövenpick ice creams contained more sucrose than indicated on the packaging.

In August 2017, Mövenpick raised prices of their ice creams in Switzerland by 2.5 per cent, to absorb increased costs of vanilla beans. The price increased after Cyclone Enawo devastating vanilla crops in Madagascar, as well as the increasing popularity of the ingredient.

References

Sources
 Details of federal court action against Mövenpick. Comcourts.gov.au.

External links

Mövenpick brand page on Nestlé website

Ice cream brands
Nestlé brands
Swiss brands